Kermia pustulosum is a species of sea snail, a marine gastropod mollusk in the family Raphitomidae.

Description
The length of the shell varies between 4 mm and 8 mm.

The color of the shell is light fulvous, the pustules tipped with red.

Distribution
This marine species occurs off Taiwan and Fiji.

References

 Liu J.Y. [Ruiyu] (ed.). (2008). Checklist of marine biota of China seas. China Science Press. 1267 pp.

External links

 
 Gastropods.com: Kermia pustulosa

pustulosum
Gastropods described in 1867